The School of Archaeology is an academic department of the University of Oxford comprising the Institute of Archaeology and the Research Laboratory for Archaeology and the History of Art (RLAHA), and is part of Oxford's Social Sciences Division. The school was created in 2000 when the two existing departments were combined under this umbrella. Both sub-departments retain separate directors, who report to the head of the School of Archaeology, who is replaced every three years.

By custom, the head alternates between an academics based in each of the sub-departments. The current head of school is Amy Bogaard. While Bogaard was due to be replaced in 2022, her term was extended by a year due to COVID-19.

Previous Heads of Department 

 Chris Gosden, 2004-2006
 
 Helena Hamerow, 2010-2013
 Andrew Wilson, 2013–2016,
 Julia Lee-Thorp, 2016–2019,
 Amy Bogaard, 2019–Present

References

Departments of the University of Oxford
Archaeological research institutes
1955 establishments in England
Archaeology of the United Kingdom
Educational institutions established in 1955
Research institutes established in 1955
Research institutes in Oxford
University and college laboratories in the United Kingdom